Jaworzyna may refer to the following places:
Jaworzyna, Łódź Voivodeship (central Poland)
 Jaworzyna, a mountain in the Silesian Beskids in Poland
Polish name for Tatranská Javorina in Slovakia